James Grover Morgan (November 15, 1885 – 1964) was an American politician from Unionville, Missouri, who served in the Missouri Senate and the Missouri House of Representatives.  He served in the Missouri House of Representatives from 1917 until 1922 where he had been majority floor leader in 1921.  He was elected to the Missouri Senate in 1926.  Morgan was educated in rural Iowa and at Kirksville State Teachers College.  He had worked as the editor and publisher of The Unionville Republican.

References

1885 births
1964 deaths
Republican Party members of the Missouri House of Representatives
Republican Party Missouri state senators
20th-century American politicians
People from Unionville, Missouri